"I Do" is a song by Swedish band Arvingarna. The song was performed for the first time in Melodifestivalen 2019, where it made it to the finale, and it ended up in seventh place in the contest. This was Arvingarna's first Melodifestivalen entry since 2002. The song charted at number six on the Swedish singles chart and was subsequently certified platinum in the country.

Charts

Weekly charts

Year-end charts

Certifications

References

2019 singles
Arvingarna songs
English-language Swedish songs
Melodifestivalen songs of 2019
Swedish pop songs
Songs written by Nanne Grönvall